Joel Boris Spira (born 18 July 1981) is a Swedish film, television, and theatre actor.

Personal
While studying biology at the University of Stockholm Spira decided to give acting a chance. After just spending one semester at Spegelteatern in Stockholm he applied to the well respected Malmö Theatre Academy where he got immediately accepted. He graduated in 2007.

Career

Theatre
Spira has since graduating from Malmö Theatre Academy appeared in several plays. He played Mowgli in Rudyard Kiplings The Jungle Book at Länsteatern in Västerås, Sweden. He later appeared in Lejonets unge at Länsteaten in Örebro. He is since 2009 part of the cast of The Brothers Lionheart at Stockholms Stadsteater where he plays the secondary lead character Jonathan.

Film
Spira made his movie debut in the 2009 short film Travemünde Trelleborg. His first appearance in a feature film was in the 2010 movie Snabba cash (English translation Easy Money) by Swedish director Daniel Espinosa. A movie based on the book Snabba cash by the author Jens Lapidus.

Television
Spira appeared in the SVT produced Children's television series Barda in 2007.
He also appeared in the SVT series Anno 1790 as one of the main characters. In 2013 he appeared in Crimes of Passion.

Spira starred in the two seasons of the drama Thicker Than Water (Tjockare än vatten) in 2014 and 2016 alongside Björn Bengtsson, Aliette Opheim and Jessica Grabowsky.

References

External links

Joel Spira's official site (in Swedish)
Snabba Cash on IMDb 

1981 births
Swedish male actors
Living people